Organobismuth chemistry is the chemistry of organometallic compounds containing a carbon to bismuth chemical bond. Applications are few. The main bismuth oxidation states are Bi(III) and Bi(V) as in all higher group 15 elements. The energy of a bond to carbon in this group decreases in the order P > As > Sb > Bi. The first reported use of bismuth in organic chemistry was in oxidation of alcohols by Frederick Challenger in 1934 (using Ph3Bi(OH)2). Knowledge about methylated species of bismuth in environmental and biological media is limited.

Discovery 
Triethylbismuth, the first known organobismuth compound, is prepared in 1850 by Löwig and Schweizer from iodoethane and a potassium–bismuth alloy. As with most trialkylbismuth compounds, BiEt3 has an extremely pungent and unpleasant odor, and is spontaneously oxidized in air. The chemistry of these complexes first begin receiving significant attention when Grignard reagents and organolithium compounds become available.

OrganoBi(III) compounds

Properties and structure

Triorganobismuth(III) compounds are monomeric with pyramidal structures reminiscent of organophosphorus(III) chemistry. The halides however adopt hypervalent structures. This trend is illustrated by the sheet-like structure adopted by methylbismuth dichloride.

Organobismuth heterocycles are based on Bi(III). The cyclic compound bismole, a structural analog of pyrrole, has not been isolated, but substituted bismoles are known. Bismabenzene has been detected in the laboratory.

Synthesis
The most general and widely used methodology for the synthesis of homoleptic trialkyl- and triarylbismuth complexes is the reaction of BiX3 with organolithium or magnesium reagents generally of the form of a Grignard reagent:

BiCl3 + 3RMgX → R3Bi + 3MgXCl
BiCl3 + 3LiR → BiR3 + 3LiCl.

The reaction of K3Bi with organic halides is the first method used to prepare triorganobismuth compounds:

K3Bi + 3RX → BiR3 + 3KX.

This method is generally more difficult, not as clean, and produces a lower yield. In some cases, however, such as the synthesis of (Me3Si)3Bi, it is the only available method

Triaryl bismuth(III) compounds are typically air-stable crystalline solids. The substituents on the triarylbismuth center can be modified.
Asymmetric organobismuth compounds are those in which there is more than one type of organic group attached to the bismuth atom. The syntheses of these compounds proceed naturally and most conveniently from the organobismuth halides RBiX2 and R2BiX.

Reactions
Triarylbismuth compounds have very limited use in organic synthesis.  They react with acylchlorides under Pd(0) catalysis to form a variety of phenyl ketones. Tricyclopropylbismuth(III) reagents  react with aryl halides and triflates under Pd(0) catalysis in a similar fashion to afford a variety of aryl and heteroaryl cyclopropanes.

Triphenylbismuth undergoes redistribution with its trihalide to give the mixed derivatives such as diphenylbismuth chloride (Ph2BiCl).  Such reactions proceed more readily than for the lighter congeners.

Triarylbismuth(III) compounds may also be employed in C–N bond forming transformations with an appropriate metal co-catalyst. For instance, Barton and coworkers demonstrated that amines could be N-arylated with a bismuth(III) reagent in the presence of copper(II) salt.

OrganoBi(V) compounds

Structure
Triarylorganobismuth complexes are easily oxidized to bismuth(V) complexes by treatment with chlorine or bromine, giving Ar3BiX2 (X = Cl, Br). Reactions with iodine result in elimination to give trivalent Ar3−xBiIx , while reactions with fluorine are too vigorous.

The nature of the aryl ligands is important in determining whether the structure of those complexes is trigonal bipyramidal or square planar, which is also related to their color. Organobismuth(V) compounds of the type Ar5Bi adopt square pyramidal structures.  The pentaphenyl compound is deeply colored and thermochromic, possibly because of an equilibrium between square pyramidal and trigonal bipyramidal structures.

Synthesis
Organobismuth(V) complexes may be accessed directly from organobismuth(III) through oxidative addition to a halogen then displacement of the newly formed bismuth-halogen bond for a bismuth-carbon bond with an alkyl or aryl lithium or Grignard reagent.

Bi(V) compounds can be accessed through Bi(III) compounds for example:
 Me3Bi + SO2Cl2 → Me3BiCl2 + SO2
 Me3BiCl2 + 2 MeLi → Me5Bi + 2 LiCl

Bi(V) easily forms an onium ion for example by protonation with p-toluenesulfonic acid:
 Ph5Bi + HO3SAr → Ph4Bi+[O3SAr−]

Pentaphenylbismuth forms an ate complex upon treatment with phenyl lithium:
 Ph5Bi + PhLi → Li+[Ph6Bi−]

The thermal stability of R5M compounds decrease in the order As > Sb > Bi. The aryl compounds are more stable than alkyl compounds. Me5Bi decomposes explosively at 20°C.

Reactions
Compared to the lighter congeners, Bi(V) compounds are oxidizing. Reactions of Ar3BiX2 with organolithium reagents are common for producing Ar5Bi complexes. Unstable, purple Ph5Bi is the first of these to be synthesized. Organobismuth(V) reagents are useful for a wide variety of organic transformations including transfer reactions, oxidation of primary, secondary, benzylic, and allylic alcohols. These reagents also cleave glycols, and under the appropriate conditions function as aryl group transfer reagents.

The compounds Ph3Bi(OOtBu)2, Ph3BiCO3 and (Ph3BiCl)2O have been investigated for the oxidation of oximes, thiols, phenols, and phosphines. Compounds such as Ph5Bi and Ph3BiCl2 have been used in the arylation of arene compounds and 1,3-dicarbonyl compounds:

The above transformation proceeds through in an asynchronous concerted fashion from the O-bound organobismuth(V) reagent after loss of an aryl group. A triarylbismuth(III) complex forms concomitantly. The regioselectivity of this transformation is guided by the directing ability of adjacent Lewis basic functionalities. It is important to note that in the above arylation, a full equivalent of the pentavalent bismuth compound is required for the arylation reaction, therefore leaving four ligands on bismuth inactive for further arylations. Catalytic manifolds of this chemistry are challenging due in part to the reoxidation of Bi(III) to Bi(V). For more examples of bismuth mediated arylations, see the cited review.

References 

Organobismuth compounds